This is a list of listed buildings in West Lothian. The list is split out by parish.

 List of listed buildings in Abercorn, West Lothian
 List of listed buildings in Bathgate, West Lothian
 List of listed buildings in Ecclesmachan, West Lothian
 List of listed buildings in Kirkliston, West Lothian
 List of listed buildings in Kirknewton, West Lothian
 List of listed buildings in Linlithgow, West Lothian
 List of listed buildings in Livingston, West Lothian
 List of listed buildings in Mid Calder, West Lothian
 List of listed buildings in Torphichen, West Lothian
 List of listed buildings in Uphall, West Lothian
 List of listed buildings in West Calder, West Lothian
 List of listed buildings in Whitburn, West Lothian

West Lothian